Baba Alakyo (born 1937) is a Nigerian herbalist, traditionalist and leader of the Ombatse militia group.

Militant activities
He was born at Alakyo village in Nasarawa Egon, a local government area of Nasarawa State, northern Nigeria where he coordinates the militia group, Ombatse militia group.
He led the May 2013 attack that resulted in the killing of 74 police officers and 10 officers of the State Security Service.
On November 17, 2014, it was reported that he was killed by unknown gunmen suspected to be Fulani herdsmen, a claim that was refuted by the legal adviser to the Ombatse group, Barr. Zachary Zamani Alumaga.

References

People from Nasarawa State
Living people
1937 births
Nigerian rebels
Herbalists